Anxiety is a 1998 Portuguese drama film directed by Manoel de Oliveira. It was screened out of competition at the 1998 Cannes Film Festival. The film was selected as the Portuguese entry for the Best Foreign Language Film at the 71st Academy Awards, but was not accepted as a nominee.

Cast

 Afonso Araújo - Boy
 Leonor Araújo - Girl
 Leonor Baldaque - Fisalina
 Fernando Bento - Fisalina's Father
 Rita Blanco - Gabi
 David Cardoso - Friend
 Luís Miguel Cintra - Son
 Diogo Dória - Him
 Alexandre Melo - Friend
 Joao Costa Menezes - Guest
 Clara Nogueira - Maid
 André Pacheco - Brother 2
 Irene Papas - Mother
 Marco Pereira - Brother 1
 José Pinto - Father
 António Reis - Count
 Isabel Ruth - Marta
 Leonor Silveira - Suzy
 Adelaide Teixeira - Stepmother
 Ricardo Trêpa - Boyfriend

See also
 List of submissions to the 71st Academy Awards for Best Foreign Language Film
 List of Portuguese submissions for the Academy Award for Best Foreign Language Film

References

External links
 

1998 films
1990s Portuguese-language films
1998 drama films
Films based on works by Agustina Bessa-Luís
Films directed by Manoel de Oliveira
Films produced by Paulo Branco
Portuguese drama films